James H. Gilbert (born March 11, 1947) is an American attorney who was a Justice of the Minnesota Supreme Court from 1998 to 2004.

References

External links
Biography: Gilbert Mediation Center website

Justices of the Minnesota Supreme Court
Living people
1947 births